Bandung Cathedral (Indonesian Gereja Katedral Bandung) is a Roman Catholic Cathedral in Bandung. Its official name is Katedral Santo Petrus ("St. Peter's Cathedral"). It is located at Jalan Merdeka, Bandung, Indonesia. The building was designed by Wolff Schoemaker in Neogothic style. Bandung Cathedral has a land area of 2,385 m2 and building area of 785 m2.

The first building of the church was named St. Regis Francis on June 16, 1895. After Bandung received the status of gemeente (municipality) in 1906, it was decided to build a new church building. Construction of the new building was started in 1921. The construction was finished in 1922 and the new cathedral was blessed on February 19, 1922, by Mgr. E. Luypen.

See also

List of church buildings in Indonesia

References

External links

 Bandung Cathedral official website

Buildings and structures in Bandung
Roman Catholic cathedrals in Indonesia
Roman Catholic churches completed in 1922
Cultural Properties of Indonesia in West Java
Gothic Revival church buildings in Indonesia
Dutch colonial architecture in Indonesia
Churches in Java
20th-century Roman Catholic church buildings in Indonesia